Ornithonyssus sylviarum (also known as the northern fowl mite) is a haematophagous ectoparasite of poultry. In both size and appearance, it resembles the red mite, Dermanyssus gallinae.

This blood-feeding parasite is broadly distributed, and has been reported on 72 host species of North American birds in 26 families. The mites have been a major pest of the poultry industry since the early 1900s.

See also
 Acariasis
 Gamasoidosis
 List of mites associated with cutaneous reactions

References

Mesostigmata
Animals described in 1877
Agricultural pest mites
Poultry diseases
Veterinary entomology
Parasites of birds
Parasites of humans
Ectoparasites
Parasitic acari